Telephone numbers in Japan consist of an area code, an exchange number, and a subscriber number.

Dialing prefixes
 001, 00xx, 002xx, 0091xx  Carrier selection prefix
 184 Prefix to withhold caller ID
 186 Prefix to provide caller ID

Types of numbers
  1xx    Special numbers
  001 and 00xx   Carrier selection codes
  0x     2-digit geographic area codes
  0xx    3-digit geographic area codes
  0xxx   4-digit geographic area codes
  0xxxx  5-digit geographic area codes
  0x0    3-digit non-Geographic area codes (excluding 010)
  0xx0   4-digit non-Geographic area codes (01x0, 0570, 0800, 0910, 0990)

Length of numbers
 Special numbers are three digits long
 Geographic numbers are 10 digits long
 0x0 Non-geographic numbers are 10 -or- 11 digits long.
 0xx0 Non-geographic numbers are 10 digits long

Three-digit numbers (special numbers)

Emergency services
  110  Police (112 and 911 redirect to 110 on mobile phones)
  118  Maritime emergencies
  119  Ambulance, Fire brigade
  171  Earthquake assistance

Operator services
  100  NTT operator
  106  Operator assisted collect call service
  108  Automated collect call service
  113  NTT technical faults hotline
  116  NTT customer service and general enquiries

Directory services
  104  NTT national directory enquiries
  0057 KDDI international directory enquiries

Special services
  114  Automated number-busy check
  115  Telegram service
  117  Speaking clock
  136  Information on last incoming call
  177  Weather forecast

Long distance carrier selection (Myline)

  001   KDDI (international)
  0032  IPS Inc.
  0033  NTT Communications
  0034  NTT Communications (international toll free)
  0036  NTT East
  0037  Fusion Communications
  0039  NTT West
  0041  SoftBank Telecom (international / former Japan Telecom)
  0053  KDDI (Resold)
  0056  KDDI (international)
  0061  SoftBank Telecom (international / former Cable and Wireless IDC)
  0066  SoftBank Telecom (international / former Cable and Wireless IDC)
  0070  KDDI Toll Free
  0071  Verizon Japan
  0077  KDDI (national)
  0080  T-Systems
  0081  Fusion Communications (former TTNet)
  0088  SoftBank Telecom (national / former Japan Telecom)
  0089  T-Systems
  0091  Brastel

10 digit numbers

Non-geographic area codes
  0120 NTT Freedial, toll free services
  0130 Automated information services
  0140 Disaster relief wireless communications
  0160 Disaster relief satellite communications
  0170 NTT Dengon Dial, chat line services
  0180 NTT Telegong, TV/Radio show feedback dial-in
  0180 NTT Teledome, automated information services
  0190 NTT Angel Line, automated directory services via PC/modem
  0190 NTT Annai Jozu, automated directory services via telephone
  0570 
  0800 Other toll free services
  020  Paging services (PDC) and data services (UMTS)
  030  Mobile telephony services (legacy systems, PDC, J-CDMA, UMTS) - currently not used
  040  Mobile telephony services (legacy systems, PDC, J-CDMA, UMTS) - currently not used
  050  IP telephony service (via internet service providers)
  060  Universal personal number services
  070  Mobile telephony and data services (PDC, J-CDMA, UMTS)
  080  Mobile telephony and data services (PDC, J-CDMA, UMTS)
  090  Mobile telephony and data services (PDC, J-CDMA, UMTS)
  0910 Private circuit access, local rate services
  0990 NTT DialQ2, premium rate services

Decommissioned area codes
  0150 formerly used for maritime wireless communications
  0450 formerly used for maritime wireless communications
  0750 formerly used for maritime wireless communications

Area codes (市外局番 "shigai-kyokuban") of selected major cities
  11  Sapporo
  138 Hakodate
  166 Asahikawa
  17-7　or 172 Aomori
  18-8 Akita
  19-6 Morioka
  22  Sendai
  23-6 Yamagata
  24-5 Fukushima
  24-6 Iwaki
  24-9 Kōriyama
  25  Niigata 
  26  Nagano
  27-2 Maebashi
  27-3 Takasaki
  28-6 Utsunomiya
  3   Tokyo (23 Special wards), Komae
  4-29 Tokorozawa
  4-70 Kamogawa
  4-71 Kashiwa
  42-6 Hachiōji
  42-7 Machida, Sagamihara
  43 　Chiba
  44  Kawasaki
  45  Yokohama
  466 Fujisawa
  46-8 Yokosuka
  47-3 Ichikawa, Matsudo
  47-4 (473 for west part of the city) Funabashi
  48-2 Kawaguchi
  48-6 or 48-7 or 48-8 Saitama
  48-9　Soka, Koshigaya
  49  Kawagoe
  52  Nagoya
  53  Hamamatsu
  53-2 Toyohashi
  54  Shizuoka
  55  Kofu
  564 Okazaki
  565 Toyota
  568 Kasugai
  569 Handa
  58  Gifu
  586 Ichinomiya
  592 Tsu, Yokkaichi
  6   Osaka, Higashiōsaka, Suita, Toyonaka, Amagasaki
  72-2 Sakai
  726 Takatsuki
  72-8 Hirakata
  73  Wakayama
  742 or 743 Nara
  75  Kyoto
  76-2 Kanazawa
  76-4 Toyama
  768 Suzu
  77-5 Ōtsu
  776 Fukui
  78  Kobe
  790 Kasai
  792 or 793 Himeji
  794 Kakogawa
  797 or 798 Nishinomiya, Takarazuka
  82  Hiroshima
  832 or 834 Shimonoseki
  839 Yamaguchi
  84  Fukuyama
  852 Matsue
  857 Tottori
  862 or 869 Okayama
  864 or 865 Kurashiki
  87 Takamatsu
  88-6 Tokushima
  88-8 Kochi
  89 Matsuyama
  92  Fukuoka
  93  Kitakyushu
  942 Kurume
  95-8 Nagasaki
  952 Saga
  956 Sasebo
  96  Kumamoto
  97  Ōita
  98-8 or 98-9  Naha
  981 or 98-5 Miyazaki
  99  Kagoshima

Geographic numbers are nine digits long, including the area code, but not including the leading zero. Consequently, densely populated areas have shorter area codes, while less populated areas have longer area codes. For example:

 6 xxxx xxxx (Osaka)
 75 xxx xxxx (Kyoto)
 742 xx xxxx (Nara)
 4992 x xxxx (Niijima island, Tokyo pref.)
 82486  xxxx (Takano, Hiroshima pref.)

Area codes increase from north to south; Sapporo in Hokkaidō (the northernmost prefecture) has 11, and Setouchi's 99-73 is far to the south in Kagoshima.  When the telephone system was devised, Okinawa was still under U.S. occupation, so when it was returned to Japan in 1972, its telephone numbers were squeezed between Miyazaki (98x) and Kagoshima (99x) and begin with 988, 989, and 980.

During the 1990s, when plans were being drawn up to amalgamate mid-sized cities and towns into larger municipalities, telephone numbering systems were merged in advance.  For example,

7442 x xxxx Kashihara (Nara prefecture)
7444 x xxxx Sakurai
74452 xxxx Takatori
74454 xxxx Asuka etc.

became:

 744 2x xxxx Kashihara
 744 4x xxxx Sakurai
 744 52 xxxx Takatori
 744 54 xxxx Asuka etc.

Many of these towns have in fact refused to merge, leaving callers with more digits to dial when making local calls.  This is partially balanced by not having to dial an area code for the neighboring city.

Area code as local brand naming

After entering the 2010s, local products and events have begun using names which come from the area code.

0465net (Odawara, Kanagawa)
0428 T-shirt (Ome, Tokyo)
028 Market (Utsunomiya, Tochigi)
028 Machinaka (Inner-City) Wi-Fi (Utsunomiya, Tochigi) 
Bar 053 (Hamamatsu, Shizuoka)

See also
 List of dialing codes in Japan
 Communications in Japan § Telephone services
 List of telephone operating companies § Japan
 Telephone numbering plan

References

ITU allocations list

External links 
 Telephone information page of the Japan National Tourist Organization (JNTO)
 Whitepages.jp Whitepages in English

 
Japan